Neural Plasticity is a peer-reviewed scientific journal covering all aspects of neuroplasticity, especially when concerning its functional involvement in the regulation of behavior and in psychopathology. The journal was established in 1989 as the Journal of Neural Transplantation and renamed in 1991 to Journal of Neural Transplantation and Plasticity, before obtaining its current name in 1998. It is published by Hindawi Publishing Corporation.

Abstracting and indexing 
The journal is abstracted and indexed in:

According to the Journal Citation Reports, the journal has a 2012 impact factor of 2.864.

References

External links 
 

Neuroscience journals
English-language journals
Publications established in 1989
Hindawi Publishing Corporation academic journals